Mosque Maryam, also known as Muhammad Mosque #2 or Temple #2, is the headquarters of the Nation of Islam, located in Chicago, Illinois. It is at 7351 South Stony Island Avenue in the South Shore neighborhood. Louis Farrakhan's headquarters are on the premises. 

The building was originally the Saints Constantine and Helen Greek Orthodox Church before it relocated to suburban Palos Hills. Elijah Muhammad, Farrakhan’s predecessor as head for NOI, purchased the building in 1972. Muhammad was lent $3 million from Libyan leader Muammar Gaddafi to convert the former church.

The main prayer hall is unusual for a mosque, since it was originally the church's nave that contained pews later replaced with seats, whereas mosques usually have only an open floor space to spread prayer rugs on which to kneel.

Adjacent to the mosque is the Muhammad University of Islam, an educational institute for boys and girls from preschool through 12th grade.

See also

 List of mosques in the United States

Notes

References

Maryam
Nation of Islam mosques
Religious buildings and structures in Chicago
Mosques converted from churches
Former churches in Illinois
20th-century mosques
Islamic organizations established in 1972
Headquarters in the United States
Mosque buildings with domes